In mathematics, the Brumer bound is a bound for the rank of an elliptic curve, proved by .

See also

Mestre bound

References

Elliptic curves
Theorems in number theory